Carter Lake may refer the following places:

 The city of Carter Lake, Iowa and Carter Lake (Iowa-Nebraska) the oxbow lake on the Iowa-Nebraska border for which the city is named
 Carter Lake (Colorado), a reservoir near Loveland, Colorado
 Carter Lake (Vancouver Island), a lake on British Columbia's Vancouver Island
 Carter Lake (Nova Scotia), a lake in Nova Scotia
 Carters Lake, a lake in Georgia (U.S. state)